Venhuizen is a town in the north-western Netherlands, in the province of North Holland and the region of West-Frisia, in the municipality of Drechterland. Venhuizen was a separate municipality until 1 January 2006, when it was merged with the existing municipality of Drechterland. It was decided to call the new municipality Drechterland.

On a map of the Hollands Noorderkwartier from 1288 is Venhuizen mentioned as Veenhusen. The name could be referring to houses at or in the fen. The Dutch Reformed church dates from the 15th century. The other large church is the Roman Catholic St. Lucaskerk (St. Lucas church), built in 1956. It's also locally called the tough (robust) church (nl: stoere).

Culture
The village fest occurs every year with Pentecost and entails a fun fair, a horse race, a volleyball tournament and several festivals. Since 2017 there is also a yearly food festival in Venhuizen named Food Festival Venhuizen. It is the largest open air restaurant in West Frisia with more than 8,000 visitors. In 2020 it will be on 9 and 10 May on De Vliegende Faam in the center of the village.

Notable people
 Hendrik Offerhaus (born 20 May 1875), rower
 Rob Compas (born 10 November 1966), road bicycle racer
 Rick Hooijboer (born 3 August 1974), football player
 Mathieu Boots (born 23 June 1976), soccer player
 Peter Koning (born 3 December 1990), racing cyclist

Gallery

References 

Municipalities of the Netherlands disestablished in 2006
Former municipalities of North Holland
Populated places in North Holland
Drechterland